Live At Tokyo Dome: Babymetal World Tour 2016 Legend Metal Resistance - Red Night & Black Night (commonly referred to as Live at Tokyo Dome) is the sixth video album by Japanese heavy metal band Babymetal. The album contains footage from the Babymetal World Tour 2016: Legend Metal Resistance and was released on April 12, 2017 by BMD Fox Records and Toy's Factory. The album features the live performances at Tokyo Dome on September 19 and September 20, 2016, which concluded the band's world tour.

Background 
On December 13, 2015, the band announced a new album, as well as a world tour to begin at Wembley Arena and conclude at Tokyo Dome. Su-metal and Yuimetal expressed the idea of performing at the venue as a dream, promising to work hard to put on a great performance. On April 1, 2016, tickets to the show were made available for purchase to "The One" fanclub members, and later for presale on the band's official website on April 4, 2016. On June 3, 2016, a second day was announced for Tokyo Dome, with tickets for the second show immediately made available to "The One" fanclub members. Both days marked the band's largest venue to date. International fans were able to purchase tickets starting August 27, 2016.

In response to the band playing at the venue, Su-metal commented, "In Japan we have played many big venues like Budokan and others, but Tokyo Dome was always a place that I have been dreaming of performing at. Even in Japan, not everyone gets a chance to perform here!"

Tickets to both shows sold out, with 55,000 people attending the concerts each day. During both shows, the box set Trilogy: Metal Resistance Episode III – Apocalypse was made available for general sale. A digest of the shows would later be broadcast by Wowow on December 18, 2016.

Live at Tokyo Dome was initially announced on January 23, 2017 as a "The One" exclusive box set release for April 1, 2017, and later on April 12, 2017 in DVD and standard and limited edition Blu-ray formats. A trailer for the video album was released on March 15, 2017, containing concerts denoted as "Red Night" (September 19, 2016) and "Black Night" (September 20, 2016), respectively. The limited edition Blu-ray release came in an analog record-sized jacket, and initial pressings of the video included a Babymetal original sticker sheet.

On April 8, 2020, as part of the band's tenth anniversary, the band released the campaign "Stay Home, Stay Metal" in response to the COVID-19 pandemic, streaming the two live performances on April 10 and April 11, 2020, respectively on YouTube. Additionally, the album was released in vinyl format on September 8, 2021 to commemorate the band's tenth anniversary.

Development 
Compared to previous tour dates, the set was more decorated, with three tombstone-shaped catwalks connected to the center stage, where stands a tower with big screens attached in a 360˚ ring, and a platform on top of it. Said platform is connected to the stage with an elevator, and can separate into three smaller stages. In addition, the stage included lasers, explosions, pyro, and a periodically rotating center stage. The three band members wore red and black costumes, which were imitated by cosplayers who attended the shows. The audience generally contained a mix of heavy metal fans and Japanese idol fans, who would headbang, sing, or dance to each song.

For the Red Night performance, audience members were all handed crystal neck braces and urged to never take off during the show. After the performance of "Tales of The Destinies", all the neck braces gradually light up as the band transitions to "The One". Reflecting on the performance, Kobametal noted that the development for the shows was done in a little over two weeks, further commenting, "Stage-wise, technical-wise, we had a lot of things we've never done before. Of course we did rehearsals, but until you do it for real you never know how it's going to turn out, or how it's going to look because we didn't have 55,000 people to test on – you're just imagining!"

Content 

The September 19 show, subtitled "Red Night", begins with an introductory video which states that the shows will not perform any song twice, nor will there be any MCs or encores. The narration explains that the crystal neck braces worn will be protection during "the harsh battle ahead", with a decree by the Fox God to not remove them. Red spotlights move around the arena, ending on the band three members who have appeared on stage with Kami Band, as the members hold flags and begin "Road of Resistance". The show mainly focused on songs released from Metal Resistance. Near the end of the concert, the band performs "Tales of The Destinies" for the first time, which leads to the entire venue going dark. Gradually, the crystal neck braces in the audience start glowing white, which transitions into the final song, the English version of "The One" which begins with the three members walking from the runways off the stage to the center, wearing golden cloaks. At the closing of the show, a video plays to remind the audience of the second show.

The show on September 20, subtitled "Black Night", focuses more on songs released from Babymetal. A video plays once more to enforce the song-repeating rule. With Kami Band playing on the stage, the three members show up crucified onto crosses on the stage, transitioning into the opener "Babymetal Death". The members walk in sync towards the center stage. During the interlude for "Megitsune", Su-metal yells to the crowd, "Are you ready? Everybody clap your hands!" while Yuimetal and Moametal continue to engage the crowd. When performing "Headbangeeeeerrrrr!!!!!" the latter two are shown in a smokescreen of carbon dioxide while the crowd headbangs to the bridge of the song. During the final song "Ijime, Dame, Zettai", the crystal neck braces worn glow red, and the song finishes with the three members repeatedly shouting "We are Babymetal!". Then they take the elevator to the top platform where Su-metal rings a gong, thus concluding Episode IV of the Metal Resistance. A final video plays, informing the audience of the band's next objective.

Critical reception 
Frédéric Leclercq positively reviewed the shows, which had been sold out, describing the production as "incredible" while describing the "tombstone-shaped catwalks" and screen-filled tower on the stage. The shows were described as "90 minutes of crazy lasers, explosions, pyro, the circular centre stage rotating from time to time", while the performance of Kami Band was called "flawless". Sue Williamson of Teen Vogue described the shows as "sensory overload in its most kawaii form", highlighting the band's "perfectly coordinated choreography, video elements, and totally unique sound".

Commercial performance 
Live at Tokyo Dome charted at number three on the Oricon DVD chart and number one on the Oricon Blu-ray chart for the week April 24, 2017, with first-week sales of 11,000 and 26,000 copies, respectively. The latter giving the band's third number one Blu-ray release and making them the female act with the fourth-most number ones on the chart, along with Nana Mizuki and AKB48, and behind Perfume, Namie Amuro and Nogizaka46. The video release also topped the charts for the DVD and Blu-ray music video charts, accumulating sales of 37,000 copies, and becoming the band's fourth consecutive release to top the latter chart.

Track listing 

Notes
 "The One" limited edition includes a 2-CD audio release, splitting the performance between tracks 7 and 8.

Notes
 "Akatsuki" includes a prelude of Kami Band playing "Mischiefs of Metal Gods".
 "The One" limited edition includes a 2-CD audio release, splitting the performance between tracks 6 and 7.

Personnel 
Credits adapted from Live at Tokyo Dome booklet.

Suzuka Nakamoto (Su-metal) – lead and background vocals
Yui Mizuno (Yuimetal) – lead and background vocals
Moa Kikuchi (Moametal) – lead and background vocals
Tue Madsen – mixing, mastering
Miyaaki Shingo – photography
Taku Fuji – photography

Charts

Release history

Notes

References

External links
 Official Babymetal website
 

Babymetal video albums
2017 video albums
2021 live albums
Live video albums
Albums recorded at the Tokyo Dome